Romantico 360°: Live From Puerto Rico is the second live album of reggaeton duo R.K.M & Ken-Y. It was released on April 14, 2009.

Track listing

CD 1:

 Yo Te Motivé Mejor Que El
 Cruz y Maldición
 Duele (feat. Tito El Bambino)
 Fans (feat. Tito El Bambino)
 Te Vas
 En Que Fallamos (feat. Ivy Queen)
 Igual Que Ayer
 Si Ya No Estás (feat. N'Klabe)
 Tu Amor (feat. Arcángel)

CD 2:

 Bonita (feat. Arcángel)
 Ton Ton Ton (feat. Nicky Jam)
 Dame Lo Que Quiero
 Medley - Si La Ves, Down y Un Sueño
 La Amas Como Yo (feat. Karis)
 Me Matas
 Yo Te Quiero (feat. Wisin & Yandel)
 Sexy Movimiento (feat. Wisin & Yandel)
 Mis Dias Sin Ti

External links
 http://www.rakimandkeny.com/

2009 live albums
R.K.M & Ken-Y albums